is a railway station on the Rikuu East Line in the city of Ōsaki, Miyagi Prefecture, Japan, operated by East Japan Railway Company (JR East).

Lines
Higashi-Ōsaki Station is served by the Rikuu East Line, and is located 19.1 rail kilometers from the terminus of the line at Kogota Station.

Station layout
Higashi-Ōsaki Station has one side platform, serving a single bi-directional track. The station is unattended.

History
Higashi-Ōsaki Station opened on 15 February 1955. The station was absorbed into the JR East network upon the privatization of JNR on 1 April 1987.

Surrounding area
former Furukawa town hall

See also
 List of Railway Stations in Japan

External links

  

Railway stations in Miyagi Prefecture
Rikuu East Line
Railway stations in Japan opened in 1955
Ōsaki, Miyagi
Stations of East Japan Railway Company